</noinclude>

 is a Japanese actor.

Ando has appeared in films such as Takeshi Kitano's Kids Return (1996), Kinji Fukasaku's Battle Royale (2000), Takashi Miike's Sukiyaki Western Django (2007), and Chen Kaige's Forever Enthralled (2008). He also appears in Tsai Ming-liang's award-winning film No No Sleep (2015), in a series of statically filmed urban scenes without dialogue.

Career
When Masanobu Ando completed school his direction towards a specific career path was not immediately concrete. In 1994 he was approached by a talent scout on the street and was offered an acting role, which began a new journey for Ando and his acting career. Ando's career took off after starring in his first film, Takeshi Kitano's Kids Return (1996), which became one of Kitano's most successful films in Japan. He played the role of Shinji, a high school student who gave up school to pursue boxing with his best friend. Ando became a popular young actor in Japan during the late 1990s, but his career slowed down in the 2000s, when he took fewer roles and was only in one or two films per year. He is most famous in the West for his psychopath-killer role of Kazuo Kiriyama in Kinji Fukusaku's Battle Royale (2000), a blockbuster dystopia film, which managed to be one of the most famous blood and gore films of the decade.

In 1998 he visited Russia to film for a Japanese show, Seinen wa Kouya wo Mezasu, where he travelled from Vladivostok to Khabarovsk along the Trans-Siberian Railway. Ando co-starred in Takashi Miike's Big Bang Love, Juvenile A with Ryuhei Matsuda. He played a supporting role in Shinya Tsukamoto's Nightmare Detective. Ando also appeared in Katsuhito Ishii's Smuggler.
He has taken part in the Toronto Film Festival.

Around 2016, the twentieth anniversary of his entry into the film industry, Ando made a comeback and starred in several films, including Sailor Suit and Machine Gun: Graduation, Gonin Saga, and Sadako vs. Kayako.

Personal life
Ando is married and has two children.

Filmography

Film

 Rex: kyoryu monogatari (1993)
 Kids Return (1996) - Shinji
 Innocent World (1998)
 Adrenaline Drive (1999) - Satoru Suzuki
 Poppoya (1999) - Toshiyuki Yoshioka
 Monday (2000) - Mitsuo Kondo, the dead man
 Space Travelers (2000) - Makoto Fujimoto ("Black Cat")
 Battle Royale (2000) - Kazuo Kiriyama - otoko 6-ban
 Transparent: Tribute to a Sad Genius (2001) - Kenichi Satomi
 Red Shadow (2001) - Akakage
 Drive (2002) - Kodama Makato
 Karaoke Terror (2003) - Sugioka
 Tokyo 10+01 (2003) - Fake
 Short Films (2003)
 Sonic Four: Peace Vibe (2003)
 69 (2004) - Tadashi "Adama" Yamada
 Black Kiss (2004) - Tatsuo Sorayama
 Synesthesia (2005) - Takashi Nohara
 Aegis (2005) - Don-chol
 Big Bang Love, Juvenile A (2006) - Shiro Kazuki
 Green Mind, Metal Bats (2006) - Ishioka
 Crickets (2006) - Taichi
 Strawberry Shortcakes (2006) - Kikuchi
 Nightmare Detective (2006) - Detective Wakamiya
 Sakuran (2006) - Seiji
 Sukiyaki Western Django (2007) - Yoichi
 Forever Enthralled (2008) - Ryuichi Tanaka
 The Butcher, the Chef and the Swordsman (2010)
 Seediq Bale (2011, part 1, 2) - Genji Kojima, Constable at Tonbara clan
 Smuggler (2011) - Spine
 R-18 Bungaku-sho Vol.1: Jijojibaku no Watashi  (2013) - Yamura
 Petal Dance (2013) - Naoto
 No No Sleep (2015, Short)
 Gonin Saga (2015) - Seiji Shikine
 Le coeur régulier (2016) - Jiro
 Sadako vs. Kayako (2016) - Spiritual Medium Kyozo
 Kashin (2016) - Yasunori Ochi
 Sailor Suit and Machine Gun: Graduation (2016) - Hajime Gakuto
 Still Life of Memories (2018) - Haruma
 Lenses on Her Heart (2018) - Yuji Kiba
 Code Blue the Movie (2018) - Hiroki Shinkai
 Day and Night (2019) - Kenichi Kitamura
 The Fable: The Killer Who Doesn't Kill (2021) - Suzuki
 Zokki (2021)
 Rurouni Kenshin: The Beginning (2021) - Takasugi Shinsaku
 The Setting Sun (2022) - Jiro Uehara
 My Brother, The Android and Me (2022)
 Thousand and One Nights (2022), Yōji
 Rohan au Louvre (2023), Ryūnosuke Tatsumi

Television
 My Friend's Lover (1997) - Tomoya Kashiwagi
 When the Saints Go Marching In (1998) - Ren Takahara
 Blue Days (1998) - Juri Sawaki
 Seinen wa Kouya o Mezasu (1999, TV Movie) - Jun
 Gakko no Kaidan: Haru no Noroi Special (2000, TV Movie) - Satô (segment "Kyôfu shinrigaku nyûmon")
 Higashino Keigo Mysteries (2012) - Bito Shigehisa / Akiyama Yuichi
 Code Blue (2017)
 Your Turn to Kill (2019)
 Kirin ga Kuru (2020–21) - Shibata Katsuie
 Ship of Theseus (2020)
 The Sun Stands Still: The Eclipse (2020)
 Fishbowl Wives (2022) - Takuya

Awards
 1996: Hochi Film Award – Newcomer Award (Kids Return)
 1996: Golden Arrow Award – Newcomer Award (film) (Kids Return)
 1996: Nikkan Sports Film Award – Best Newcomer (Kids Return)
 1996: Japanese Movie Critics Awards – Best Newcomer (Kids Return)
 1996: Kinema Junpo Award – Best New Actor (Kids Return)
 1997: Japan Academy Prize – Newcomer of the Year (Kids Return)
 1997: Mainichi Film Awards – New Talent Award (Kids Return)
 1997: Tokyo Sports Film Award – Best Newcomer (Kids Return)
 1997: Yokohama Film Festival – Best New Talent (Kids Return)

References

External links
 Official website
 

1975 births
Living people
People from Kawasaki, Kanagawa
Japanese male television actors
20th-century Japanese male actors
21st-century Japanese male actors
Japanese male film actors
Former Stardust Promotion artists